A list of animated feature films first released in 1999.

Highest-grossing animated films of the year

See also
 List of animated television series of 1999

References

 Feature films
1999
1999-related lists